František Čermák and Leoš Friedl were the defending champions, but did not participate this year.

Enzo Artoni and Fernando Vicente won in the final 3–6, 6–0, 6–4, against Yves Allegro and Michael Kohlmann.

Seeds

Draw

Draw

External links
Draw

2004 ATP Tour
2004 Grand Prix Hassan II